How Does It Feel is the second studio album by American indie pop duo MS MR, released July 17, 2015, on Columbia Records. It includes the singles "Painted" and "Criminals".

Track listing

Charts

References 

2015 albums
MS MR albums
Columbia Records albums